German submarine U-855 was a Type IXC/40 U-boat built for Nazi Germany's Kriegsmarine during World War II.

Design
German Type IXC/40 submarines were slightly larger than the original Type IXCs. U-855 had a displacement of  when at the surface and  while submerged. She had two shafts and two  propellers.

U-855 was fitted with six  torpedo tubes (four fitted at the bow and two at the stern), 22 torpedoes, one  SK C/32 naval gun, 180 rounds, and a  SK C/30 as well as a  C/30 anti-aircraft gun. The boat had a complement of forty-eight.

Service history
U-855 was ordered on 5 June 1941 from DeSchiMAG AG Weser in Bremen under the yard number 1061. Her keel was laid down on 21 October 1942 and the U-boat was launched the following year on 17 April 1943. She was commissioned into service under the command of Kapitänleutnant Albert Sürenhagen (Crew 36) in 4th U-boat Flotilla.

On 3 April 1944 Sürenhagen handed over command to Oberleutnant zur See Prosper Ohlsen (Crew 36). U-855 transferred to the 10th U-boat Flotilla for front-line service and left Kiel for operations in the North Atlantic on 22 June 1944, but experienced engine problems which forced her to return to Kiel. The U-boat left Kiel again on 1 July and served as a weather boat in the North Atlantic until September 1944.

An attack on an unescorted freighter on 6 September 1944 was not successful. The following day, 9 September, she refuelled U-516 before making for port. Her last transmission was received on 11 September 1944, after that the U-boat was missing.

Since U-855 would have had to pass through known mine barrages about a week into her return voyage. Since she failed to report the successful passage, as other U-boats would do, she was probably sunk by a mine in the Northern Barrage on 17 October. That day another U-boat in the vicinity,  reported hearing an explosion of a mine. The previous assumption that U-855 was attacked and sunk by a British aircraft, Liberator 'A' of No. 224 Squadron RAF, on 24 September is not correct as this attack damaged .

References

Bibliography

External links

World War II submarines of Germany
German Type IX submarines
1943 ships
Missing U-boats of World War II
U-boats commissioned in 1943
U-boats sunk by mines
Ships built in Bremen (state)
Maritime incidents in September 1944